Congdonia is a genus of butterflies in the family Lycaenidae. It contains only one species, Congdonia duplex, which is found in south-eastern Tanzania (the genus is endemic to the Afrotropics). Its habitat consists of montane forests.

Adults have been recorded on wing in February.

References

Endemic fauna of Tanzania
Butterflies described in 2004
Poritiinae
Monotypic butterfly genera